The Premier of Nevis heads the Nevis Island Administration, an autonomous governing body within the Federation of Saint Kitts and Nevis.

List of premiers of Nevis (1983-present)

See also
List of prime ministers of Saint Kitts and Nevis
List of leaders of dependent territories

Nevis, Premiers of
Politics of Saint Kitts and Nevis
Nevis